Sir Augustus Prevost, 1st Baronet (21 May 1837 – 6 December 1913) was Governor of the Bank of England from 1901 to 1903.

He was the son of banker George Prevost of Geneva, who moved in 1838 from Liverpool to London, where Augustus studied at University College before joining the family firm of Morris, Prevost and Co in 1856.

He became a partner in the firm in 1861 and senior partner in 1882, during which time the business evolved from a merchants into a private bank. He was also chairman of the Royal Exchange Assurance Corporation. A director of the Bank of England from 1881 he served as governor of the bank from 1901 to 1903. During Prevost's tenure as governor, the Panic of 1901 occurred.

In 1902 he was made Baronet Prevost of Westbourne Terrace, London in recognition of his services as Governor of the Bank of England during the Boer War.

He died with no heir in Brighton in 1913 and the baronetcy became extinct. The company of Morris, Prevost and Co was taken over by Barings Bank the following year. He had married Francis Fordham in 1867.

References

1837 births
1913 deaths
Businesspeople from Liverpool
British bankers
Governors of the Bank of England
Baronets in the Baronetage of the United Kingdom
19th-century English businesspeople